The Distinguished Service Medal (DSM) is a military decoration issued by the Irish Government.  After the Military Medal for Gallantry (An Bonn Míleata Calmachta), it is the next highest award of the Military awards and decorations of Ireland.

It is issued in three grades: 
 Distinguished Service Medal 1st Class or The Distinguished Service Medal with Honour, in silver. 
 Distinguished Service Medal 2nd Class or The Distinguished Service Medal with Distinction, in bronze. 
 Distinguished Service Medal 3rd Class or The Distinguished Service Medal with Merit, in bronze.

External links
 Medals of the Irish Defence Forces  by BQMS Ger O'Connor 54 Reserve Artillery Regiment Mullingar 2010
 Irish medals

Orders, decorations, and medals of Ireland